Galilea Airport  is an airport serving the river town of Puerto Galilea (es) in the Amazonas Region of Peru. The runway is south of the town, which is within a bend of the Rio Santiago, a tributary of the Marañón River, the principal source of the Amazon River.

Airlines and Destinations

See also

Transport in Peru
List of airports in Peru

References

External links
OpenStreetMap - Galilea
OurAirports - Galilea
SkyVector - Galilea

Airports in Peru
Buildings and structures in Amazonas Region